Max Edwards (born 29 November 1990), also known by the nicknames of "Max-E" and "Maxi", is an English professional rugby league and rugby union footballer who has played in the 2010s.

Background
Edwards was born in Feltham, London, England.

Playing career
Edwards made his first grade début for the Harlequins RL in 2010's Super League XV he played  in the 4-62 defeat by Leeds Rhinos at Headingley Rugby Stadium, Leeds on Saturday 6 March 2010. Edwards made his first-team début against the Melbourne Storm at the Twickenham Stoop in the World City Challenge in 2010.
Edwards has played rugby union as an outside centre for Lindfield Rugby Club in Sydney's 2nd Division Suburban Rugby Competition. Edwards is renowned for his "no nonsense" style of play.

References

External links
Harlequins Rugby League profile
Sport First profile

1990 births
Living people
English rugby league players
London Broncos players
People from Feltham
Rugby league hookers
Rugby league halfbacks
Rugby league players from Greater London